ODMR may refer to:

 On-Demand Mail Relay
 Optically detected magnetic resonance, a double resonance technique which combines electron paramagnetic resonance with measurements such as fluorescence, phosphorescence and absorption